Princess Virginia von Fürstenberg (Virginia Carolina Theresa Pancrazia Galdina Prinzessin zu Fürstenberg; born 18 April 1940), known professionally as Ira von Fürstenberg, is an Italian socialite, actress, jewelry designer and former public relations manager for the fashion designer Valentino Garavani. She is a member by birth of the princely family of Fürstenberg and a former member by marriage of the princely family of Hohenlohe-Langenburg.

Background
The daughter of Prince Tassilo zu Fürstenberg and his first wife, Clara Agnelli, she was born in Rome, Italy. Her paternal grandparents were Prince Karl Emil von Fürstenberg (1867–1945) and the Hungarian Countess Mária Matild Georgina Festetics von Tolna (24 May 1881– 2 March 1953), who was the daughter of Prince Tassilo Festetics von Tolna and Lady Mary Victoria Douglas-Hamilton. Her maternal great-grandmother was an American heiress, Jane Bourbon del Monte, Princess di San Faustino ( Campbell).

The elder of her two brothers was Prince Egon von Fürstenberg, a fashion designer. She also has a younger brother, Prince Sebastian.

Her former sister-in-law is the fashion designer Diane von Fürstenberg, and an uncle was Gianni Agnelli, the chairman of FIAT. She is a first cousin of Prince Karl von Schwarzenberg, a former Minister of Foreign Affairs of the Czech Republic. She speaks several languages, including Italian, French, German, Spanish and English.

She is the patron of a number of charities, including the Children of Africa Foundation set up by Dominique Ouattara.

Personal Life

Her first husband, whom she married at Venice, Italy, on 17 September 1955, was Prince Alfonso of Hohenlohe-Langenburg (1924–2003), who founded the Marbella Club, a Spanish resort. At the time of the wedding, the bride was 15 and the groom was 31. They were divorced in 1960, and the marriage was annulled in 1969.

They had two children:
 Christoph Victorio Egon Humberto (known as "Kiko"; 8 November 1956 – 5 August 2006), who died of massive organ failure a few days after being imprisoned in Klongprem Central Prison in Bangkok on charges of suspicion of illegally altering a visa. His health had been weakened from a weight-loss regimen at a Thai wellness center.
 Hubertus Rudolph (known as "Hubi"; born 2 February 1959), a musician and photographer who was on Mexico's Olympic skiing team in 1984, 1988, 1992, 1994, 2010 and 2014. Married to Simona Gandolfi on 17 June 2019 in Vaduz.
Her second husband was Francisco "Baby" Pignatari (1916–1977), a Brazilian industrialist. They married in Reno, Nevada, on 12 January 1961. They divorced in Las Vegas in January 1964 and had no children.

Film career
Ira von Fürstenberg was a star of European-made B-movies in the 1960s, 1970s and 1980s. 

Her film appearances included the spy spoof Matchless (1968, co-starring Patrick O'Neal), I Killed Rasputin (1967), Dead Run (1967, co-starring Peter Lawford), My Bed Is Not for Sleeping (1968), The Vatican Affair (1968), The Battle of El Alamein (1969), Five Dolls for an August Moon (1970), No desearás al vecino del quinto (1970) and The Fifth Cord (1971).

Notable published works
 Young at Any Age: Thirty Three of the World's Most Elegant Women Reveal How They Stay Beautiful (1981) 
 Tartanware: Souvenirs from Scotland (1996) 
 Princesse et Rebelle (2002)

See also
Gloria Emerson, "Her Closets Brim With Fashion: Princess Virginia Ira von und zu Furstenberg", The New York Times, 14 April 1966.

References

External links

 
 Ira von Fürstenberg at aenigma

1940 births
Living people
Agnelli family
German socialites
Ira
Actresses from Rome
Ira
Nobility from Rome